Prologue is the third studio album by the English progressive rock band Renaissance, released in October 1972.

Overview
In 1972, Renaissance's then-new management disbanded the then current line-up (one of several short-lived transitional line-ups), retaining only ex-The Gentle People singer Annie Haslam and former Rupert's People keyboard player John Tout to build a new band around. The new members added at this point were bassist Jon Camp, drummer Terence Sullivan and guitarist Mick Parsons. Shortly thereafter, Parsons died in a car accident. Electric guitarist Rob Hendry was brought in at the last minute to replace him for the recording sessions of June and July 1972, and left the band soon after the album was completed.

Because Prologue was a new start for the band, with a line-up that now included none of the original members, it would frequently be referred to as their "first" album (for example, on the Live at Carnegie Hall album, both in a song intro and on the inside cover).

Though all the songs are Renaissance originals, they were not written by any current members of the band but by former members Jim McCarty (from the first line-up) and Michael Dunford (ex-Nashville Teens, from the transitional line-ups), along with lyricist Betty Thatcher. Dunford would become part of the band again after Hendry's departure, but was not officially a band member during the recording of next album Ashes Are Burning in 1973.

In The Beginning reissue
In 1978 Prologue was reissued, together with the following album Ashes Are Burning, as a double album called In the Beginning (Capitol Records, USA). The original double LP with gatefold sleeve included the complete Prologue, but one song from Ashes was edited. The 1988 CD version of In the Beginning (on one disc) had edited versions of "Rajah Khan" and of two songs from Ashes Are Burning. Prologue was re-issued on CD in its original form by Repertoire Records in 1995.

Expanded 2018 edition
In  2018 Esoteric Recordings announced a re-mastered and expanded edition of the first Haslam era album which was released on the 28 September 2018.

Track listing

Additional tracks

Personnel 
Credits are adapted from the album's liner notes.

Annie Haslam - lead vocals (all except track 2), backing vocals, percussion
Rob Hendry - electric and acoustic guitars, mandolin, chimes, backing vocals
John Tout - acoustic and electric keyboards, backing vocals, arrangements
Jon Camp (listed as "John Camp") - electric bass guitar, lead vocals (track 2), backing vocals, tampoura, arrangements (uncredited)
Terence Sullivan - drums, percussion

Additional musicians
Michael Dunford - arrangements
Francis Monkman - VCS3 synthesizer solo on track 6

Production
Miles Copeland - producer, live photos
Mike Weighell, Mick Glossop - engineers
Hipgnosis and Ronchetti & Day - cover art

References

Notes

Renaissance (band) albums
1972 albums
Albums with cover art by Hipgnosis
Capitol Records albums
Harvest Records albums
Regal Zonophone Records albums
EMI Records albums
Repertoire Records albums
Symphonic rock albums